Tomoaki Egawa (江川 智晃, born October 31, 1986 in Futami, Mie) is a Japanese former professional baseball outfielder in Japan's Nippon Professional Baseball. He played with the Fukuoka SoftBank Hawks from 2006 to 2019.

External links

NPB stats

1986 births
Living people
People from Ise, Mie
Japanese expatriate baseball players in the United States
Waikiki Beach Boys players
Nippon Professional Baseball outfielders
Fukuoka SoftBank Hawks players